Euarestella nigra is a species of tephritid or fruit flies in the genus Euarestella of the family Tephritidae.

Distribution
United Arab Emirates.

References

Tephritinae
Insects described in 2008
Diptera of Asia